Basanti Kumal Chaudhari is a Nepalese sportsperson who set a national record in Javelin Throw during 5th National Game of Nepal held in Kathmandu.

References

See also
Kumal people

Living people
Nepalese female athletes
Nepalese javelin throwers
Year of birth missing (living people)
Place of birth missing (living people)
People from Dang District, Nepal
Female javelin throwers